Wilhelm Westlund (born March 15, 1995) is a Swedish professional ice hockey defenceman. He is currently playing with BIK Karlskoga of the HockeyAllsvenskan (Allsv). He was selected by the Colorado Avalanche in the 7th round (183rd overall) of the 2013 NHL Entry Draft.

Playing career
After joining Färjestad BK as a 15-year-old, Westlund made his professional debut three-years later in the Elitserien playing with Färjestad during the 2012–13 Elitserien season. In the completion of the 2013–14 season, having played 11 games with the senior team, Westlund opted to return to Stockholm in signing a three-year contract with Djurgårdens IF on July 11, 2014.

On August 11, 2014, Westlund was given a season loan by Djurgården to further develop in the Allsvenskan with HC Vita Hästen. Prior to the 2014–15 season, Westlund attended his first NHL training camp with the Avalanche before returning to Hästen on September 21, 2014.

With his NHL rights no longer held by the Avalanche, Westlund continued with Djurgårdens IF through to the 2016–17 season. He appeared in three scoreless games with DIF, unable to cement a roster spot he was initially loaned familiarly to the Allsvenskan with Almtuna IS on October 13, 2016. After a successful two-week period, Westlund was released from his contract with Djurgårdens and opted to sign and continue for the remainder of the season with Almtuna on November 1, 2016. Westlund appeared in 33 games and contributed with 7 points before he was released to fellow Allsvenskan club, Timrå IK, to fill a shortage of players due to injury on February 15, 2017.

Westlund played the following two seasons in the Allsvenskan with previous club, HC Vita Hästen, before leaving as a free agent at the conclusion of the 2018–19 season. On April 17, 2019, he agreed to remain in the second tier Allsvenskan, signing a one-year contract with BIK Karlskoga.

Career statistics

Regular season and playoffs

International

References

External links

1995 births
Living people
Almtuna IS players
BIK Karlskoga players
Colorado Avalanche draft picks
Djurgårdens IF Hockey players
Färjestad BK players
Swedish ice hockey defencemen
Timrå IK players
HC Vita Hästen players
Ice hockey people from Stockholm